Mocquard's cylindrical skink (Chalcides pulchellus) is a species of skink that lives in southwestern Burkina Faso. Its Latin name means "pretty".

References

External links 
 Reptile database 

Skinks of Africa
Reptiles of West Africa
Reptiles described in 1906
Taxa named by François Mocquard